Robert Douglas Martin Jr. (born August 17, 1999) is an American baseball outfielder for the Colorado Rockies organization. He played college baseball for the Florida State Seminoles.

Amateur career
Martin was born and grew up in Tampa, Florida and attended Thomas Jefferson High School. As a senior, he batted .453 with four home runs and 24 RBIs as Jefferson won the Class 6A state championship. Martin was selected in the  37th round of the 2018 Major League Baseball draft by the Miami Marlins, but did not sign with the team.

Martin played in 63 games as a true freshman and batted .315 with 17 doubles, four home runs, and 54 RBIs. He was named the Atlantic Coast Conference All-Freshman team and a Freshman All American by the Collegiate Baseball Newspaper. He slashed .324/.439/.412 with 14 RBIs and ten runs scored through 17 games of his sophomore season before it was cut short due to the coronavirus pandemic. Martin entered his junior season on the watch list for the Golden Spikes Award. Martin finished the season with a .260 batting average, 11 home runs, and 51 RBIs and was named third team All-ACC.

Professional career
Martin was selected in the eighth round with the 230th overall pick in the 2021 Major League Baseball draft by the Colorado Rockies. He split his first professional season with the Arizona Complex League Rockies and the Fresno Grizzlies, batting .256 with three home runs and 12 RBIs over 25 games.

References

External links

Florida State Seminoles bio

1999 births
Florida State Seminoles baseball players
Baseball players from Florida
Baseball outfielders
Living people